Magalys García Leliebre (born 23 October 1971 in Songo – La Maya) is a retired Cuban heptathlete.

International competitions

Personal bests
200 metres – 23.67 (Mar del Plata 1995)
800 metres – 2:13.58 (Havana 1996)
100 metres hurdles – 13.18 (Guatemala City 1995)
High jump – 1.75 (Havana 1996)
Long jump – 5.99 (Havana 1990)
Shot put – 14.11 (Maracaibo 1998)
Javelin throw – 51.05 (Winnipeg 1999)
Heptathlon – 6352 (Havana 1996)

External links

1971 births
Living people
Cuban heptathletes
Athletes (track and field) at the 1991 Pan American Games
Athletes (track and field) at the 1995 Pan American Games
Athletes (track and field) at the 1999 Pan American Games
Athletes (track and field) at the 2003 Pan American Games
Athletes (track and field) at the 1996 Summer Olympics
Athletes (track and field) at the 2000 Summer Olympics
Olympic athletes of Cuba
Pan American Games medalists in athletics (track and field)
Pan American Games gold medalists for Cuba
Pan American Games silver medalists for Cuba
Pan American Games bronze medalists for Cuba
Central American and Caribbean Games gold medalists for Cuba
Competitors at the 1990 Central American and Caribbean Games
Competitors at the 1993 Central American and Caribbean Games
Competitors at the 1998 Central American and Caribbean Games
Central American and Caribbean Games medalists in athletics
Medalists at the 1991 Pan American Games
Medalists at the 1995 Pan American Games
Medalists at the 1999 Pan American Games
Medalists at the 2003 Pan American Games